Manganese monosilicide (MnSi) is an intermetallic compound, a silicide of manganese. It occurs in  cosmic dust as the mineral brownleeite. MnSi has a cubic crystal lattice with no inversion center; therefore its crystal structure is helical, with right-hand and left-hand chiralities.

MnSi is a paramagnetic metal that turns into a ferromagnet at cryogenic temperatures below 29 K. In the ferromagnetic state, the spatial arrangement of electron spins in MnSi changes with magnetic field, forming helical, conical, skyrmion, and regular ferromagnetic phases.

Crystal structure and magnetism

Manganese monosilicide is a non-stoichiometric compound, meaning that the 1:1 Mn:Si composition, lattice constant and many other properties vary depending on the synthesis and processing history of the crystal.

MnSi has a cubic crystal lattice with no inversion center; therefore its crystal structure is helical, with right-hand and left-hand chiralities.
At low temperatures and magnetic fields, the magnetic structure of MnSi can be described as a stack of ferromagnetically ordered layers lying parallel to the (111) crystallographic planes. The direction of magnetic moment varies from layer to layer by a small angle due to the  antisymmetric exchange.

Upon cooling to temperatures below Tc = 29 K, MnSi changes from a paramagnetic into a ferromagnetic state; the transition temperature Tc decreases with increasing pressure, vanishing at 1.4 GPa.

Electron spins in MnSi show dissimilar, yet regular spatial arrangements at different values of applied magnetic field. Those arrangements are named helical, skyrmion, conical, and regular ferromagnetic. They can be controlled not only by temperature and magnetic field, but also by electric current, and the current density required for manipulating skyrmions (~106 A/m2) is approximately one million times smaller than that needed for moving magnetic domains in traditional ferromagnets. As a result, skyrmions in MnSi have potential application in ultrahigh-density magnetic storage devices.

Synthesis
Centimeter-scale single crystals of MnSi can be prepared by direct crystallization from the melt using the Bridgman, zone melting or Czochralski methods.

References

Manganese compounds
Transition metal silicides
Iron monosilicide structure type